P. G. Wodehouse (1881–1975) was an English humorist.

Wodehouse may also refer to:
Wodehouse (surname)
4608 Wodehouse, a main-belt asteroid
The Wodehouse, an English country house near Wombourne, Staffordshire, England, United Kingdom
Wodehouse District, a district of Cape Province, South Africa

See also

Wild man